Marcelo Demoliner and Rodrigo Guidolin were the defending champions. Demoliner decided not to participate and Guidolin partnered with Marcel Felder.
Franco Ferreiro and André Sá won the title, defeating Ricardo Mello and Caio Zampieri 7–6(5), 6–3 in the final.

Seeds

Draw

Draw

References
 Doubles Draw

Aberto de Brasilia - Doubles
Aberto de Brasília